Pari Abasalti (Persian: پری اباصلتی), born 1935 in Tehran, is an Iranian politician. She was elected to the Iranian National Consultative Assembly in 1975 and was a member of parliament until the Iranian Revolution in 1979, when she left Iran and immigrated to the United States.

She is remembered as Editor-in-Chief of Ettelaat-e Banuvan while in the US she founded the magazine "Rah zendegie" which means "way of living" that is still running in Los Angeles.

References

1935 births
20th-century Iranian women politicians
Living people

fa:پری اباصلتی